Hygroplitis is a genus of braconid wasps in the family Braconidae. There are about nine described species in Hygroplitis, found in the Holarctic.

Species
These nine species belong to the genus Hygroplitis:
 Hygroplitis basarukini Kotenko, 1993
 Hygroplitis melligaster (Provancher, 1886)
 Hygroplitis nigritus Luo & You, 2005
 Hygroplitis pseudorussatus Shaw, 1992
 Hygroplitis rugulosus (Nees, 1834)
 Hygroplitis ruinosus Kotenko, 2007
 Hygroplitis russatus (Haliday, 1834)
 Hygroplitis sinicus (Xu & He, 2000)
 Hygroplitis toritarsis Song & Chen, 2004

References

Further reading

 
 
 

Microgastrinae